Below is the list of asteroids that have come close to Earth in 2022.

Timeline of known close approaches less than one lunar distance from Earth 
A list of known near-Earth asteroid close approaches less than 1 lunar distance from Earth in 2022. During 2022 about 124 asteroids passed within 1 LD of Earth. As most asteroids passing within a lunar distance are less than 40 meters in diameter, they generally are not detected until they are within several million km of Earth.

The first asteroid flyby within 1 LD of Earth in 2022 was asteroid 2021 YK (10–20 meters in diameter), which was observed on 27 December 2021 04:40 UT (when it was about 3.8 million km from Earth) and passed  from Earth on 2 January 2022.

Every year, dozens of asteroids impact Earth with enough force to be detected by infrasound sensors designed to detect detonation of nuclear devices, but the vast majority of impacts are unpredicted and occur without warning. Fortunately, most occur over uninhabited areas.

Warning times by size 
This sub-section visualises the warning times of the close approaches listed in the above table, depending on the size of the asteroid. It shows the effectiveness of asteroid warning systems at detecting close approaches. The sizes of the charts show the relative sizes of the asteroids to scale. For comparison, the approximate size of a person is also shown. This is based the absolute magnitude of each asteroid, an approximate measure of size based on brightness.

Absolute magnitude 30 and greater
 (size of a person for comparison)

Absolute magnitude 29-30

Absolute magnitude 28-29

Absolute magnitude 27-28

Absolute magnitude 26-27
(probable size of the Chelyabinsk meteor)

Absolute magnitude 25-26

Predicted close approaches 

Below is the list of predicted close approaches of near-Earth asteroids larger than magnitude 27, that were predicted at the start of the year to occur in 2022. This relates to the effectiveness of asteroid cataloging systems at predicting close approaches. A predicted close approach distance of within ±50% is considered to be a successful prediction.

For asteroids which were observed but not predicted, see the main list above.

Notes

Additional examples 
Below is an example list of near-Earth asteroids that passed or nominally will pass more than 1 lunar distance (384,400 km or 0.00256 AU) from Earth in 2022. During 2021 over 1000 asteroids passed within  of Earth.

Notes

See also 
List of asteroid close approaches to Earth
List of asteroid close approaches to Earth in 2021
List of asteroid close approaches to Earth in 2023
Asteroid impact prediction

References 

close approaches to Earth in 2022
Near-Earth asteroids